Galcanezumab, sold under the brand name Emgality, is a humanized monoclonal antibody used for the prevention of migraine. It is also used for cluster headaches.

Common side effects include pain or redness at the site of injection. Other side effects may include hypersensitivity reactions. A substance called calcitonin gene-related peptide (CGRP) has been shown to be involved in the development of migraine by widening blood vessels in the brain. Galcanezumab is a monoclonal antibody (a type of protein) designed to attach to and block CGRP, thereby helping blood vessels to return to their normal size. This will stop the symptoms of migraine.

This drug was developed by Eli Lilly. It was approved for medical use in the United States and in the European Union in 2018, becoming the third calcitonin gene-related peptide (CGRP) inhibitor to do so. When used for migraines it costs about 7,000 per year in the United States .

History
In September 2018, galcanezumab-gnlm was approved in the United States for the preventive treatment of migraine in adults.

The U.S. Food and Drug Administration (FDA) approved galcanezumab-gnlm based on evidence from three clinical trials (Trial 1/NCT02614183, Trial 2/NCT02614196, and Trial 3/NCT02614261) in 2156 adult patients 18 to 65 years of age with chronic or episodic migraine headaches. Trials were conducted at 318 sites in Asia, Canada, Europe, Israel, Latin America, Puerto Rico, and the United States.

Trials one and two enrolled patients with a history of episodic migraine headaches. Patients were assigned to receive galcanezumab-gnlm or placebo injections once a month for six months. Neither the patients nor the health care providers knew which treatment was being given until after the trial was completed. The benefit of galcanezumab-gnlm was assessed based on the change from baseline in the number of migraine days per month during the six-month treatment period, comparing patients in the galcanezumab-gnlm and placebo groups.

Trial three enrolled patients with a history of chronic migraine headaches. Patients were assigned to receive galcanezumab-gnlm or placebo injection once a month for three months. Neither the patients nor the health care providers knew which treatment was being given until after the trial was completed. The benefit of galcanezumab-gnlm was assessed based on the change from baseline in the number of migraine days per month during the three-month treatment period, comparing the galcanezumab-gnlm and placebo groups.

In November 2018, galcanezumab was approved for use in the European Union for the prophylaxis of migraine in adults who have at least four migraine days per month.

Galcanezumab was shown to be effective at reducing the number of days participants had migraines in three main studies. Overall, galcanezumab led to two fewer days with migraines per month compared with placebo (a dummy treatment). In two studies involving 1,784 participants who had migraines between 4 and 14 days a month, those treated with galcanezumab had four or five fewer days with migraines per month, compared with two to three fewer days for participants on a placebo injection. In a third study of 1,117 participants who had migraines for more than 15 days a month on average (chronic migraine), those treated with galcanezumab had on average around five fewer days with migraines per month compared with around three fewer days for participants on placebo.

In June 2019, galcanezumab-gnlm was approved in the United States for the treatment of episodic cluster headache in adults.

The effectiveness of galcanezumab-gnlm for the treatment of episodic cluster headache was demonstrated in a clinical trial that compared the drug to placebo in 106 patients. The trial measured the average number of cluster headaches per week for three weeks and compared the average changes from baseline in the galcanezumab-gnlm and placebo groups. During the three-week period, patients taking galcanezumab-gnlm experienced 8.7 fewer weekly cluster headache attacks than they did at baseline, compared to 5.2 fewer attacks for patients on placebo.

The application for galcanezumab-gnlm was granted priority review designation and breakthrough therapy designation. The FDA granted the approval of Emgality to Eli Lilly

References

External links
 

Antimigraine drugs
Breakthrough therapy
Eli Lilly and Company brands
Monoclonal antibodies